The Jeffersonian was a weekly newspaper published on Thursdays, in Jeffersontown, Jefferson County, Kentucky.  The Jeffersonian was first published on June 13, 1907, and was last published in 1965.

History

Beginning
The Jeffersonian was founded by W. C. Barrickman and J. C. Alcock

Alcock later bought out Barrickman and became the sole owner of the paper.

In 1913 Alcock bought half of the old Jefferson County Bank's lot and, later in 1913, constructed a new building for The Jeffersonian. The new Jeffersonian building contained the offices and presses for the paper, In addition to The Jeffersonian, The St Matthews Sun was also printed and distributed from this building.

Although headquartered in, and focused on, Jeffersontown, Kentucky, The Jeffersonian reported on all of Jefferson County.   The Jeffersonian reported from as far away as Bullitt and Spencer counties as well.

The Jeffersonian soon had upwards of forty reporters, much of The Jeffersonian's information came from a group of ladies, from various parts of Jefferson County, who gathered it up for the paper.

Decline
The Jeffersonian went into decline when the Kentucky statutes were changed to require that legal notices were to be printed in the newspaper of each county with the largest circulation.  As The Jeffersonian was not the newspaper with the largest circulation in Jefferson County it lost a lot of advertising revenue that it had previously garnered from legal notices.

Demise
In 1959 Alden J. Schansberg bought The Jeffersonian. In 1965 Schansberg merged The Jeffersonian into the St. Matthews Voice.

References

External links
 Online archive of selected issues from the Kentucky Digital Library

Bibliography
 The Jeffersonian, Jeffersontown, KY: The Jeffersonian Publishing Co. (Inc.), (December 5, 1940), pp. 1–2.  
 Kleber, John E.: The Encyclopedia of Louisville, Lexington, KY: University Press of Kentucky, (2001) p. 442.   
 Kentucky Division of Geographic Information Poster (2007).
 Retired Louisville Publisher Dies, Lexington, KY: Lexington Herald-Leader, (January 15, 1986), p. B7.  
 The Register of the Kentucky State Historical Society Vol. 13, No. 37, Frankfort, KY: The Kentucky State Historical Society, (1915), p. 92.

Defunct newspapers published in Louisville, Kentucky
Defunct weekly newspapers
Jeffersontown, Kentucky
Newspapers established in 1907
Publications disestablished in 1965
1907 establishments in Kentucky
1965 disestablishments in Kentucky